Gay Community News may refer to:

Gay Community News (Boston)
Gay Community News (Dublin)